{{Speciesbox
| taxon = Conus raulsilvai
| image =Conus raulsilvai 1.jpg
| image2 =Conus raulsilvai 2.jpg
| image_caption =Apertural and abapertural views of shell of  Conus raulsilvai Rolán, E.M., A.A.Monteiro & F.Fernandes, 1998
| status = LC
| status_system = IUCN3.1  
| status_ref = 
| authority =  Rolán, Monteiro & Fernandes, 1998
| synonyms_ref = 
| synonyms =
 Africonus raulsilvai (Rolán, Monteiro & Fernandes, 1998)
 Conus (Lautoconus) raulsilvai Rolán, Monteiro & Fernandes, 1998 · accepted, alternate representation
| display_parents = 3
}}Conus raulsilvai is a species of sea snail, a marine gastropod mollusk in the family Conidae, the cone snails and their allies.

Like all species within the genus Conus, these snails are predatory and venomous. They are capable of "stinging" humans, therefore live ones should be handled carefully or not at all.

Description
The size of the shell varies between 17 mm and 25 mm.

Distribution
This species occurs in the Atlantic Ocean in Cape Verde. It is known only from Maio Island, from shallow water. It must be an insular endemic, and it is a species at high risk of extinction.

References

 Rolán E., Monteiro A. and Fernandes C. 1998. Cone shells from Cape Verde Island: new developments, with description of a new species.'' La Conchiglia 30(286): 36–44, 6 figs., 1 map.
  Puillandre N., Duda T.F., Meyer C., Olivera B.M. & Bouchet P. (2015). One, four or 100 genera? A new classification of the cone snails. Journal of Molluscan Studies. 81: 1-23

External links
 The Conus Biodiversity website
Cone Shells - Knights of the Sea

raulsilvai
Gastropods described in 1998
Gastropods of Cape Verde
Endemic fauna of Cape Verde
Fauna of Maio, Cape Verde